Chiriquí Grande is a district (distrito) of Bocas del Toro Province in Panama. The population according to the 2000 census was 7,431; the latest official estimate (for 2019) is 14,533. The district covers a total area of 210 km². The capital lies at the town of Chiriquí Grande.

Administrative divisions
Chiriquí Grande District is divided administratively into the following corregimientos:

 Chiriquí Grande
 Bajo Cedro
 Miramar
 Punte Peña
 Punta Robalo
 Rambala

References

Districts of Bocas del Toro Province